Joseph Ryan Warren (born October 31, 1976) is an American Greco-Roman wrestler and mixed martial artist who most recently competed for Bellator MMA. In Bellator, Warren became the first fighter in the promotions history to become world champion in 2 divisions, winning the Bellator Featherweight World Championship in 2010 and the Bantamweight World Championship in 2014. As a Greco-Roman wrestler, he won the 2006 Pan American and World Championship and was a favorite for the 2008 Olympics. He later participated in and won the Gold Medal at the 2007 World Cup.

During the end of 2008 Warren started transitioning to mixed martial arts, and on March 8, 2009, he made his professional debut. He has competed for Bellator MMA, and Dream in Japan. He is a former Bellator Bantamweight Champion and former Bellator Featherweight Champion. Warren is currently ranked as the #24 Bantamweight in the world by fightmatrix.com.

Greco-Roman wrestling career
Warren practiced freestyle wrestling before switching to Greco-Roman. He began his career at East Kentwood High School where he placed 3 times in Division one with one state championship coming during his senior year and held the national takedown record. He wrestled for the University of Michigan.

He won the  division of men's Greco-Roman wrestling at the 2006 FILA Wrestling World Championships and was a favorite for the 2008 Summer Olympics in Beijing, China.
In 2007 he missed Pan American Games at Rio de Janeiro because of positive test for cannabis. In 2008 he got 2 years ban from international wrestling competition and missed 2008 Summer Olympics.

On December 18, 2010, it was reported that Warren would be making a return to wrestling, to try to qualify for the 2012 Summer Olympics in London. This did not occur.

Mixed martial arts career

DREAM
Joe Warren started a transition to MMA in 2008 and joined up with Team Quest where he got to train with fellow Greco-Roman wrestler and Pride Fighting Championship Champion Dan Henderson. His MMA debut was on March 8, 2009, at Dream.7, where he defeated former WEC Bantamweight Champion Chase Beebe by TKO (doctor stoppage) after the first round due to a cut Beebe received over his right eye. In the second round of the tournament, at Dream.9 on May 26, 2009, he was matched up with and defeated former K-1 Hero's Lightweight Grand Prix Champion, and formerly 17–1, Norifumi Yamamoto in his first fight after a 512-day layoff officially due to elbow and knee injuries. In preparation for the bout Warren trained with former WEC Featherweight Champion Urijah Faber and his Team Alpha Male after Faber called Warren and told him he knew how to defeat Yamamoto. Faber had previously prepared Joseph Benavidez to fight Yamamoto in July 2008, but the fight did not happen as Yamamoto pulled out three days before the fight.  Warren's fight happened as planned though, and after going the allotted 15 minutes Warren was awarded a split decision victory.

The final two rounds of the tournament took place at Dream 11 which took place on October 6, 2009. In his scheduled semi-final bout Warren fought Brazilian jiu-jitsu expert Bibiano Fernandes, where he quickly lost due to a controversial first-round armbar after securing a takedown.

Bellator Fighting Championships

2010
On February 1, 2010, Warren officially announced that he signed with Bellator Fighting Championships, and that he would compete in the Featherweight tournament during Bellator's Season 2.

At Bellator 13, Warren fought in a quarter-final bout against Eric Marriott. Warren dominated the fight with his wrestling and took the fight on all three judges score cards, giving him the unanimous decision win. Warren advanced to the semi-final round where he defeated Georgi Karakhanyan via unanimous decision at Bellator 18.

On June 24, 2010, Warren won the Bellator featherweight tournament by claiming a split-decision over Patricio Freire. Joe was both dropped and caught in a rear-naked choke in the first round. He came back in rounds 2 and 3 by scoring takedowns followed by a ground and pound attack.  The official scores were (29–28), (28–29), and (29–28). After the fight, Bellator Fighting Championships Featherweight Champion Joe Soto came into the ring and the two exchanged words, with Warren telling Soto "you've got my belt" and Soto promising to hold onto the title.

The title fight took place on September 2, 2010, at Bellator 27 in the third season of Bellator Fighting Championships. This was Warren's first title shot. Following a dominant opening round by Soto, Warren won the fight via KO (strikes) in the opening minute of the second round to become the new Bellator Featherweight champion.

2011
Warren faced Marcos Galvão in a non-title fight on April 16, 2011, at Bellator 41. In the fight Galvão negated a majority of Warren's offense for the first two rounds by showing strong takedown defense, taking down Warren multiple times, taking Warren's back, and executing good knees from the clinch. In the third round he was taken down by Warren and controlled throughout the round. At the end of the fight, Bellator color commentator, Jimmy Smith, believed Galvão won the fight 29–28. Along with Smith, many top MMA sites, (MMAJunkie, Sherdog, MMAFighting, MMASpot), all believed that Galvão won the fight by 29–28. It was then announced that Warren had won the fight via unanimous decision (30–27, 29–28, 29–28).

Warren was expected to put his title on the line versus Patricio Freire at Bellator 47 on July 23, 2011, but had to be postponed due to Pitbull's unexpected injury.

In the fall of 2011, Warren was entered the Bellator Season 5 bantamweight tournament. He was hoping to become the promotion's first two division champion. Warren faced fellow amateur wrestling world champion, Alexis Vila, at Bellator 51, in the quarterfinal round of Bellator's season five bantamweight tournament. He lost the fight via KO in the first round.

2012
Warren fought Pat Curran on March 9, 2012, at Bellator 60 in the first defense of his Bellator Featherweight Championship.  He lost the fight via KO in the third round.

After losing the title, Warren returned and faced Owen Evinger on November 9, 2012, at Bellator 80. He won the fight via unanimous decision.

2013
On February 5, 2013, it was announced that Warren would be one of the four coaches to appear on the promotion's reality series titled Fight Master: Bellator MMA.

Joe Warren was set to fight Nick Kirk at Bellator 98 in the semifinal match of Bellator season nine bantamweight tournament, however he was not cleared to fight because he was knocked out in a sparring session prior to the fight. The fight was then rescheduled for Bellator 101 on September 27, 2013. Warren won via submission in the second round.

Warren faced Travis Marx in the finals on November 8, 2013, at Bellator 107. He won via TKO in the second round to win the Bellator season nine Bantamweight tournament.

2014
Warren was scheduled to face Bellator Bantamweight champion Eduardo Dantas at Bellator 118.  However, on April 26, 2014, it was revealed that Dantas was injured head and withdrew from the fight.  Warren was to face Rafael Silva in an Interim Bantamweight title fight. Silva, however, missed weight and the promotion made the interim title available only if Warren were to win. Warren won the fight via unanimous decision to become the Bellator Interim Bantamweight champion.

Warren faced Eduardo Dantas in a title unification bout on October 10, 2014, at Bellator 128. He won the fight via unanimous decision to become the undisputed Bellator Bantamweight Champion.

2015
Warren made his first bantamweight title defense against Marcos Galvão in a rematch on March 27, 2015, at Bellator 135. He lost the fight and the title via verbal submission due to a kneebar in the second round.

Warren faced WEC and Bellator veteran L.C. Davis in the main event of Bellator 143 on September 25, 2015. He won the fight via unanimous decision.

2016
Warren next faced undefeated prospect Darrion Caldwell in a title eliminator in the main event at Bellator 151 on March 4, 2016. He lost the fight via technical submission due to a rear-naked choke in the first round.

Warren faced Sirwan Kakai at Bellator 161 on September 16, 2016. He won the fight via guillotine choke submission in the third round.

Warren faced Eduardo Dantas in a rematch at Bellator 166 on December 2, 2016, for the Bellator bantamweight championship. He lost the fight via majority decision.

2017
Warren faced prospect Steve Garcia at Bellator 181 on July 14, 2017. He won the fight by unanimous decision.

2018
Warren faced Joe Taimanglo at Bellator 195 on March 2, 2018. He lost the fight via split decision.

Warren next faced Shawn Bunch on November 30, 2018, at Bellator 210. He lost the bout via first round technical knockout.

Departure
After 2 years of inactivity, Bellator MMA announced on October 27, 2020, that Warren had been released from the promotion.

Personal life
Warren and his wife have a son who was born July 5, 2008 and a girl, Maddox Reese Warren, who was born March 4, 2010.

Championships and accomplishments

Mixed martial arts
 Bellator Fighting Championships
 Bellator Featherweight World Championship (One time)
 Bellator Bantamweight World Championship (One time)
 Interim Bellator Bantamweight Championship (One time)
 Bellator Season 2 Featherweight Tournament Championship
 Bellator Season 9 Bantamweight Tournament Championship
 First fighter to hold Championships in multiple weight classes
 Oldest Fighter to win a championship in Bellator History (37 years and 362 days)
 Most decision wins in Bellator History (8)
 DREAM
 DREAM 2009 Featherweight Grand Prix Semifinalist
 FIGHT! Magazine
 2009 Upset of the Year vs. Norifumi Yamamoto on May 26
 Fight Matrix
 2008 Rookie of the Year

Professional wrestling
 Real Pro Wrestling
 RPW Season One 132 lb Championship Semifinalist

Amateur wrestling
 International Federation of Associated Wrestling Styles
 2007 World Cup Senior Greco-Roman Gold Medalist
 2007 Dave Schultz Memorial International Open Senior Greco-Roman Silver Medalist
 2006 FILA Wrestling World Championships Senior Greco-Roman Gold Medalist
 2006 Pan American Championships Senior-Greco Roman Gold Medalist
 2005 Sunkist Kids/ASU International Open Senior Greco-Roman Gold Medalist
 2005 Dave Schultz Memorial International Open Senior Greco-Roman Gold Medalist
 2004 Henri Deglane Challenge Senior Greco-Roman Bronze Medalist
 2004 Dave Schultz Memorial International Open Senior Greco-Roman Silver Medalist
 2003 NYAC Christmas International Open Senior Greco-Roman Gold Medalist
 2003 Henri Deglane Challenge Senior Greco-Roman Silver Medalist
 2003 Sunkist Kids International Open Senior Greco-Roman Gold Medalist
 2002 Henri Deglane Challenge Senior Greco-Roman Silver Medalist
 2002 Dave Schultz Memorial International Open Senior Greco-Roman Silver Medalist
 USA Wrestling
 FILA World Team Trials Senior Greco-Roman Winner (2005, 2006, 2007)
 USA Senior Greco-Roman National Championship (2005, 2006, 2007)
 USA Senior Greco-Roman National Championship 3rd Place (2004)
 USA Wrestling Greco-Roman Wrestler of the Year (2006)
 USA University Greco-Roman National Championship (1998)
 2005 NYAC Holiday Tournament Senior Greco-Roman Gold Medalist
 2004 NYAC Christmas Championships Senior Greco-Roman Gold Medalist
 2004 USA Olympic Team Trials Senior Greco-Roman Runner-up
 2002 NYAC Christmas Classic Senior Greco-Roman Silver Medalist
 National Wrestling Hall of Fame Dan Gable Museum
 Alan and Gloria Rice Greco-Roman Hall of Champions Inductee (2009)
 National Collegiate Athletic Association
 NCAA Division I Collegiate National Championship 3rd Place (2000)
 NCAA Division I All-American (2000)
 Big Ten Conference Championship Runner-up (1998, 1999)
 Michigan High School Athletic Association
 MHSAA Class A High School State Championship (1995)
 MHSAA Class A High School State Championship 3rd Place (1994)
 MHSAA Class A All-State (1993, 1994, 1995)

World Championships Matches

|-
!  Res.
!  Record
!  Opponent
!  Score
!  Date
!  Event
!  Location
!  Notes
|-
! style=background:white colspan=9 |
|-
| Win
| 7-2
| align=left |  David Bedinadze
| style="font-size:88%"|1-1, 4-1, 2-1
| style="font-size:88%"|2006-09-20
| style="font-size:88%"|2006 World Wrestling Championships
| style="text-align:left;font-size:88%;" |  Guangzhou, China
| style="text-align:left;font-size:88%;" | Gold Medal
|-
| Win
| 6-2
| align=left |  Eusebiu Diaconu
| style="font-size:88%"|1-1, 2-1
| style="font-size:88%"|2006-09-20
| style="font-size:88%"|2006 World Wrestling Championships
| style="text-align:left;font-size:88%;" |  Guangzhou, China
| style="text-align:left;font-size:88%;" | 
|-
| Win
| 5-2
| align=left |  Vyacheslav Djaste
| style="font-size:88%"|4-1, 2-0
| style="font-size:88%"|2006-09-20
| style="font-size:88%"|2006 World Wrestling Championships
| style="text-align:left;font-size:88%;" |  Guangzhou, China
| style="text-align:left;font-size:88%;" | 
|-
| Win
| 4-2
| align=left |  Ali Ashkani
| style="font-size:88%"|2-1, 1-1
| style="font-size:88%"|2006-09-20
| style="font-size:88%"|2006 World Wrestling Championships
| style="text-align:left;font-size:88%;" |  Guangzhou, China
| style="text-align:left;font-size:88%;" | 
|-
| Win
| 3-2
| align=left |  Dilshod Aripov
| style="font-size:88%"|2-3, 3-1, 3-1
| style="font-size:88%"|2006-09-20
| style="font-size:88%"|2006 World Wrestling Championships
| style="text-align:left;font-size:88%;" |  Guangzhou, China
| style="text-align:left;font-size:88%;" | 
|-
! style=background:white colspan=9 |
|-
| Loss
| 2-2
| align=left |  Vahan Juharyan
| style="font-size:88%"|0-2, 1-1
| style="font-size:88%"|2005-09-30
| style="font-size:88%"|2005 World Wrestling Championships
| style="text-align:left;font-size:88%;" |  Budapest, Hungary
| style="text-align:left;font-size:88%;" | 
|-
| Loss
| 2-1
| align=left |  Ali Ashkani
| style="font-size:88%"|1-2, 0-7
| style="font-size:88%"|2005-09-30
| style="font-size:88%"|2005 World Wrestling Championships
| style="text-align:left;font-size:88%;" |  Budapest, Hungary
| style="text-align:left;font-size:88%;" | 
|-
| Win
| 2-0
| align=left |  Luis Liendo
| style="font-size:88%"|9-5, 7-0
| style="font-size:88%"|2005-09-30
| style="font-size:88%"|2005 World Wrestling Championships
| style="text-align:left;font-size:88%;" |  Budapest, Hungary
| style="text-align:left;font-size:88%;" | 
|-
| Win
| 1-0
| align=left |  Eric Buisson
| style="font-size:88%"|Fall
| style="font-size:88%"|2005-09-30
| style="font-size:88%"|2005 World Wrestling Championships
| style="text-align:left;font-size:88%;" |  Budapest, Hungary
| style="text-align:left;font-size:88%;" | 
|-

Mixed martial arts record

|-
| Loss
| align=center | 15–8
|Shawn Bunch
|TKO (submission to punches)
|Bellator 210
|
|align=center|1
|align=center|1:42
|Thackerville, Oklahoma, United States
|
|-
| Loss
| align=center | 15–7
| Joe Taimanglo
| Decision (split)
| Bellator 195
| 
| align=center | 3
| align=center | 5:00
| Thackerville, Oklahoma, United States
| 
|-
| Win
| align=center | 15–6
| Steve Garcia
| Decision (unanimous)
| Bellator 181
| 
| align=center | 3
| align=center | 5:00
| Thackerville, Oklahoma, United States
| 
|-
| Loss
| align=center | 14–6
| Eduardo Dantas
| Decision (majority)
| Bellator 166
| 
| align=center | 5
| align=center | 5:00
| Thackerville, Oklahoma, United States
| 
|-
| Win
| align=center | 14–5
| Sirwan Kakai
| Submission (guillotine choke)
| Bellator 161
| 
| align=center | 3
| align=center | 1:04
| Cedar Park, Texas, United States
|
|-
| Loss
| align=center | 13–5
| Darrion Caldwell
| Technical Submission (rear-naked choke)
| Bellator 151
| 
| align=center | 1
| align=center | 3:23
| Thackerville, Oklahoma, United States
|
|-
| Win
| align=center | 13–4
| L.C. Davis
| Decision (unanimous)
| Bellator 143
| 
| align=center | 3
| align=center | 5:00
| Hidalgo, Texas, United States
|
|-
| Loss
| align=center | 12–4
| Marcos Galvão
| Verbal Submission (kneebar)
| Bellator 135
| 
| align=center | 2
| align=center | 0:45
| Thackerville, Oklahoma, United States
| 
|-
| Win
| align=center | 12–3
| Eduardo Dantas
| Decision (unanimous)
| Bellator 128
| 
| align=center | 5
| align=center | 5:00
| Thackerville, Oklahoma, United States
| 
|-
| Win
| align=center | 11–3
| Rafael Silva
| Decision (unanimous)
| Bellator 118
| 
| align=center | 5
| align=center | 5:00
| Atlantic City, New Jersey, United States
| 
|-
| Win
| align=center | 10–3
| Travis Marx
| TKO (knee and punches)
| Bellator 107
| 
| align=center | 2
| align=center | 1:54
| Thackerville, Oklahoma, United States
| 
|-
| Win
| align=center | 9–3
| Nick Kirk
| Submission (reverse triangle armbar)
| Bellator 101
| 
| align=center | 2
| align=center | 3:03
| Portland, Oregon, United States
| 
|-
| Win
| align=center | 8–3
| Owen Evinger
| Decision (unanimous)
| Bellator 80
| 
| align=center | 3
| align=center | 5:00
| Hollywood, Florida, United States
|
|-
| Loss
| align=center | 7–3
| Pat Curran
| KO (punches)
| Bellator 60
| 
| align=center | 3
| align=center | 1:25
| Hammond, Indiana, United States
| 
|-
| Loss
| align=center | 7–2
| Alexis Vila
| KO (punch)
| Bellator 51
| 
| align=center | 1
| align=center | 1:04
| Canton, Ohio, United States
| 
|-
| Win
| align=center | 7–1
| Marcos Galvão
| Decision (unanimous)
| Bellator 41
| 
| align=center | 3
| align=center | 5:00
| Yuma, Arizona, United States
| 
|-
| Win
| align=center | 6–1
| Joe Soto
| KO (knee and punches)
| Bellator 27
| 
| align=center | 2
| align=center | 0:33
| San Antonio, Texas, United States
| 
|-
| Win
| align=center | 5–1
| Patricio Freire
| Decision (split)
| Bellator 23
| 
| align=center | 3
| align=center | 5:00
| Louisville, Kentucky, United States
| 
|-
| Win
| align=center | 4–1
| Georgi Karakhanyan
| Decision (unanimous)
| Bellator 18
| 
| align=center | 3
| align=center | 5:00
| Monroe, Louisiana, United States
| 
|-
| Win
| align=center | 3–1
| Eric Marriott
| Decision (unanimous)
| Bellator 13
| 
| align=center | 3
| align=center | 5:00
| Hollywood, Florida, United States
| 
|-
| Loss
| align=center | 2–1
| Bibiano Fernandes
| Submission (armbar)
| Dream 11
| 
| align=center | 1
| align=center | 0:42
| Yokohama, Japan
| 
|-
| Win
| align=center | 2–0
| Norifumi Yamamoto
| Decision (split)
| Dream 9
| 
| align=center | 2
| align=center | 5:00
| Yokohama, Japan
| 
|-
| Win
| align=center | 1–0
| Chase Beebe
| TKO (doctor stoppage)
| Dream 7
| 
| align=center | 1
| align=center | 10:00
| Saitama, Saitama, Japan
|

See also
 List of current mixed martial arts champions
 List of male mixed martial artists

References

External links
  (archive)
 
 Joe Warren profile at the National Wrestling Hall of Fame

1976 births
Living people
American male mixed martial artists
American male sport wrestlers
Featherweight mixed martial artists
Bantamweight mixed martial artists
Mixed martial artists utilizing collegiate wrestling
Mixed martial artists utilizing Greco-Roman wrestling
Mixed martial artists utilizing boxing
World Wrestling Championships medalists
Bellator MMA champions
Bellator male fighters
University of Michigan alumni